Yohandry José Orozco Cujía (born 19 March 1991) is a Venezuelan footballer who plays for Selangor as an attacking midfielder.

Club career

In Venezuela
Orozco made his professional debut in 2007 with Unión Atlético Maracaibo, aged 16, against Deportivo Anzoátegui. On 2009 he signed with Zulia FC, having a strong presence in the main squad. In the 2010–11 season he became a basic key in the lineup of the Zulians, scoring eight goals in the first half of the tournament.

VfL Wolfsburg
On 28 January 2011, it was reported that Orozco would sign a four-year contract with VfL Wolfsburg, pending a medical test and economical terms with Zulia FC. He is the third Venezuelan player in the Fußball-Bundesliga, after Juan Arango and Tomás Rincón. The deal was completed on 31 January. The 19-year-old has put pen to paper on a deal that will run until 30 June 2015. With only 1.64 m in height, he is the shortest player to ever being fielded in the German Bundesliga. He never managed to fit a spot in the regular lineup, playing only seven games since his arrival.

Return to homeland 
After an unsuccessful period in German football, it was reported on 1 June 2013 that he will be signing for Venezuelan team Deportivo Táchira in a three-year contract.

New York Cosmos 
On 29 January 2016, he signed with the New York Cosmos of the North American Soccer League.

Club statistics
Accurate as of 2 September 2012

International career
As an Under-20 international, having played the 2009 FIFA U-20 World Cup, he also was in the squad for the 2011 South American Youth Championship. In this tournament, on 24 January 2011, he scored a noticed goal against Perú, in an individual play.

He made his debut with the senior team on 3 March 2010, in a friendly match against Panamá. In June 2011, Orozco joined the squad who played the 2011 Copa América and went on to finish in fourth place.

International goals

|-
| 1. || 14 August 2013 || Pueblo Nuevo, San Cristóbal, Venezuela ||  || 2–2 || 2–2 || Friendly
|}

Honors
Venezuela
Copa América 4th place (copper medal): 2011

References

External links
 
 

1991 births
Living people
Venezuelan footballers
Venezuelan expatriate footballers
Venezuela international footballers
2011 Copa América players
UA Maracaibo players
Zulia F.C. players
VfL Wolfsburg players
Deportivo Táchira F.C. players
New York Cosmos (2010) players
Deportes Tolima footballers
Club Puebla players
Atlético Junior footballers
Independiente Santa Fe footballers
Venezuelan Primera División players
Bundesliga players
Categoría Primera A players
Association football midfielders
Expatriate footballers in Germany
Expatriate soccer players in the United States
Expatriate footballers in Mexico
Expatriate footballers in Colombia
Venezuelan expatriate sportspeople in Germany
Venezuelan expatriate sportspeople in the United States
Venezuelan expatriate sportspeople in Mexico
Venezuelan expatriate sportspeople in Colombia
Sportspeople from Maracaibo